Ronnie Pfeffer (born June 17, 1992) is a Canadian football placekicker and punter for the Calgary Stampeders of the Canadian Football League (CFL). He was originally signed as an undrafted free agent on July 1, 2015 by the Toronto Argonauts. He was a member of both the 104th Grey Cup champion Ottawa Redblacks and the 105th Grey Cup champion Argonauts. He played CIS football for the Wilfrid Laurier Golden Hawks.

Professional career
Pfeffer re-signed with the Calgary Stampeders on February 10, 2021.

References

External links
Calgary Stampeders bio 
Wilfrid Laurier profile

1992 births
Living people
Canadian football placekickers
Canadian football punters
Players of Canadian football from Ontario
Sportspeople from Kitchener, Ontario
Toronto Argonauts players
Wilfrid Laurier Golden Hawks football players
Ottawa Redblacks players
Calgary Stampeders players